Ponte Velha (Macieira de Cambra) is a bridge in Portugal. It is located in Vale de Cambra, Aveiro District. It is a granite and masonry single arch bridge that was built in the 18th and 19th centuries.  It is listed by the Direção-Geral do Património Cultural.

References

See also
List of bridges in Portugal

Bridges in Aveiro District